The large moth subfamily Lymantriinae contains the following genera beginning with Z:

Zavana

References 

Lymantriinae
Lymantriid genera Z